Tarchamps is a small town in the commune of Lac de la Haute-Sûre, in north-western Luxembourg.  , the town has a population of 284.

Lac de la Haute-Sûre
Towns in Luxembourg